Mylvaganam Mudaliyar Subramaniam (c. 1870 – 1945) was a Ceylon Tamil lawyer, politician and member of the Legislative Council of Ceylon and State Council of Ceylon.

Early life and family
Subramaniam was born around 1870. He was the son of Mylvaganam Mudaliyar, a wealthy coconut estate owner from Sambativu near Trincomalee in eastern Ceylon.

Subramaniam had three sons - Alagrajah, Tharmarajah and Manickarajah.

Career
Subramaniam was a crown proctor and a member of the Trincomalee District Local Board. He contested the 1924 legislative council election as a candidate for the Trincomalee seat and was elected to the Legislative Council of Ceylon. Subramaniam contested the 1931 state council election as a candidate for the Trincomalee-Batticaloa seat and was elected to the State Council of Ceylon. He was elected Deputy Chairman of Committees when the new State Council met in July 1931.

Subramaniam died in 1945.

Electoral history

References

1870 births
1945 deaths
Ceylonese proctors
Deputy chairmen of committees of the Parliament of Sri Lanka
Local authority councillors of Sri Lanka
Members of the Legislative Council of Ceylon
Members of the 1st State Council of Ceylon
People from Eastern Province, Sri Lanka
People from British Ceylon
Sri Lankan Tamil lawyers
Sri Lankan Tamil politicians
Year of birth uncertain